The O.W.L. Society was founded in 1887 at the University of Virginia as a secret society devoted to the literary arts.  Founded two years prior to the Thirteen Society and T.I.L.K.A., both founded in 1889, the O.W.L. Society can claim to be the oldest secret society existing at the university today, though it has not been in continuous existence since its founding.

Founding and early history

The original O.W.L. Society appears to have been a primarily social group of influential University students. Among the Society's founders was Thomas Longstreet Wood, a student active in literary pursuits, who later went on to publish Arcade Echoes, a compilation of the best student writing during his time at the university. Mr. Wood died at a young age soon after graduation.

It was classified as a ribbon society, similar to Eli Banana and T.I.L.K.A., with which it shared a substantial number of common members. The O.W.L. also included many members of prominent fraternities, such as Delta Kappa Epsilon, in its ranks. Eli Banana and T.I.L.K.A. dominated University social and political affairs at the time, and also drew their membership from the fraternities, giving us a good indication of the Society's importance in the university community. The O.W.L. was accordingly regarded in fairly high respect, and definitely as a “good thing,” as the students of the day called something they approved of. Of the ribbon societies, the 1895 edition of the university's annual, Corks and Curls, ranked the O.W.L. just below Eli Banana and T.I.L.K.A. in terms of social prominence, and highly in terms of academic performance.

The O.W.L. published its membership in Corks and Curls, but its proceedings, membership selection, and other activities were held secret. The Society operated on a single ball system in membership proceedings, that is, one vote in the negative from any member was sufficient to exclude a candidate from the Society.  The Society remained small, never including more than eight members at one time. The pages of Corks and Curls also give us two mottos, one Latin and one French. In Latin,“De mortuis nil nisi bonum” is translated as “Nothing but good about things past” or “Of the dead, nothing unless good.”  In French,“La nuit porte conseil” is translated as “The night brings sound counsel.”

Though its specific activities remain unknown, it can be reasonably assumed that the O.W.L. served to support the university's burgeoning literary scene, which at the time included College Topics, the Virginia University Magazine, Corks and Curls, and numerous minor student publications, many of which were founded within just a few years of the O.W.L. These literary institutions, particularly a student newspaper, were hallmarks of an expanding University, which was growing both in terms of size and prestige.

On January 19, 1894, seven years after its founding, the O.W.L was re-organized: “In order to promote the literary spirit not merely in a narrow circle but in the whole College, the constitution was amended and the qualification for membership made honorary.”  The Society was transformed from a purely social organization to one with both social and practical functions. Its membership was now drawn from the ranks of editors of important University publications including the Virginia University Magazine, College Topics, and Corks and Curls. This reconstituted organization likely served as a forum to bring student literary leaders together with the goals of improving and promoting their respective publications. As is the case today, early University literary endeavors sometimes struggled with low readership, small numbers of subscriptions, and the corresponding challenging financial situations. Membership in the O.W.L. would have allowed the leaders of these organizations to engage and collaborate, share best practices, and assist each other in the often-arduous task of managing a student publication. At the same time, the Society would have built and strengthened friendships among these students outside of their professional capacities.

Dissolution and re-founding
The O.W.L. began to fade from University life in the early 1920s. The Society appeared in Corks and Curls for the final time in 1921, and it appears likely that the second iteration of the organization dissolved around this time. Several brief attempts were made to revive the O.W.L. throughout the 1920s as a purely functional organization. In 1923, College Topics recorded that the O.W.L. “reorganized” and merged with Sigma Delta Chi, formerly the university's chapter of the national journalistic fraternity. Topics noted that the new organization would “[act] as an unofficial group of students interested in student publications, gathered for the purpose of encouraging all journalistic activities at the University of Virginia.”  In 1928, the O.W.L. was again resurrected, this time with the purpose of sponsoring the satirical student publication known as The Yellow Journal, which was then facing considerable criticism from faculty and students alike for its practice of anonymous publication. During the years 1929 and 1930, the masthead of the Yellow Journal read, in part, “Sponsored by the OWLS (the damned fools).”  After 1930, the O.W.L. was no longer mentioned in the masthead, and the Journal ceased publication entirely in 1934. It is almost certain that the O.W.L., if it had not folded already, ceased to exist at this point.

The exact reason for the O.W.L.’s disappearance remains unclear, although numerous theories abound. One such rationale, published in the Cavalier Daily in 1968, asserts that the O.W.L. may have become what is now known as the Seven Society.  The article suggests that the members of the O.W.L., taking to heart University President Edwin Alderman’s admonition that a more “beneficial” secret society be formed on Grounds, began taking action in greater secrecy under a new title. As the new organization gained prominence, the O.W.L. gradually became less relevant and was discontinued. The Seven Society's first public announcement, in 1915, coincided with the O.W.L.’s changing its heading in Corks and Curls from a secret society to a club. (Corks and Curls, however, frequently changed the internal organization of its pages from issue to issue.) Though interesting to consider, no hard evidence is known to exist to support this theory. More likely, perhaps, is that a combination of student apathy, increasing pressure from other social organizations, and financial hardship brought on by the Great Depression combined to cause the Society’s collapse. No further iterations of the O.W.L. Society are known to have existed between its closure in the 1930s and its refounding in 2013.

The O.W.L. announced its reorganization through a letter in the Cavalier Daily on October 19, 2013, saying "We resurrect the O.W.L. to support, cultivate and enrich literary culture at the University of Virginia."

Notable members

Notable members of the O.W.L. Society included James Rogers McConnell, in his capacity as Editor-in-Chief of the 1910 Corks and Curls. McConnell is yet another auspicious University student who died at a young age after being shot down by German fighters over Flavy-le-Martel, France during World War I. He is commemorated by the university in the Aviator statue that stands by Alderman Library.

Other notable members of the O.W.L. included:
 Senator Oscar Underwood, Senate Minority Leader, House Majority Leader
 Ambassador Hugh S. Cumming, Jr.
 Congressman John W. Fishburne
 James Hay Jr., the author of “The Honor Men” 
 J. H. C. Bagby, the founder of Corks and Curls
 Thomas Longstreet Wood, Editor of "Virginia University Magazine" and "Arcade Echoes"
 Edward A. Craighill, the author of The Good Old Song
 William McCulley James, the driving force behind the creation of the Raven Society
 James P. C. Southall, author of "In the Days of My Youth..."
 Evan Behrle, Rhodes Scholar

See also
 Secret societies at the University of Virginia
 Collegiate secret societies in North America

References

Collegiate secret societies
University of Virginia
Student societies in the United States
1887 establishments in Virginia
Student organizations established in 1887